In enzymology, an unspecific monooxygenase is an enzyme that catalyzes the chemical reaction

RH + reduced flavoprotein + O2  ROH + oxidized flavoprotein + H2O

The 3 substrates of this enzyme are RH (reduced substrate), reduced flavoprotein, and O2, whereas its 3 products are ROH  (oxidized substrate), oxidized flavoprotein, and H2O.

This enzyme belongs to the family of oxidoreductases, specifically those acting on paired donors, with O2 as oxidant and incorporation or reduction of oxygen. The oxygen incorporated need not be derived from O2 with reduced flavin or flavoprotein as one donor, and incorporation of one atom of oxygen into the other donor. Other names in common use include microsomal monooxygenase, xenobiotic monooxygenase, aryl-4-monooxygenase, aryl hydrocarbon hydroxylase, microsomal P-450, flavoprotein-linked monooxygenase, and flavoprotein monooxygenase. This enzyme participates in 7 metabolic pathways: fatty acid metabolism, androgen and estrogen metabolism, gamma-hexachlorocyclohexane degradation, tryptophan metabolism, arachidonic acid metabolism, linoleic acid metabolism, and metabolism of xenobiotics by cytochrome p450. It employs one cofactor, heme.

Structural studies

References

 
 
 
 
 
 
 
 
 
 
 
 
 
 
 
 
 

EC 1.14.14
Heme enzymes
Enzymes of known structure